Hugh of Chalon (1220–1266) was count of Burgundy by his marriage to Adelaide, Countess of Burgundy, on 1 November 1236, when he was aged 16.  He was the son of John, Count of Chalon, and his first wife, Mahat, daughter of Hugh III, Duke of Burgundy.

Hugh and Adelaide had the following children:
 Otto IV, Count of Burgundy (born 1248)
 Hugh (fl. 1312), Lord of Montbrison and Aspremont, married Bonne daughter of Amadeus V, Count of Savoy
 Étienne (died 1299)
 Reginald of Burgundy (died 1322), Count of Montbéliard by his marriage to Guillemette of Neufchâtel
 Henri
 Jean (died 1302), Lord of Montaigu
 Alix, nun at Fontevraud Abbey
 Elisabeth (died 1275), married Count Hartmann V of Kyburg
 Hippolyte, Lady of Saint-Vallier, married Count Aymar IV of Poitiers and Diois
 Guyonne of Burgundy (died 1316), married Thomas III of Piedmont
 Marguerite, nun at Fontevraud Abbey
 Agnès, Lady of Saint-Aubin, married Count Philippe II de Vienne, Lord of Pagny

Hugh III's wife remarried to Philip I, Count of Savoy a year after his death and she was succeeded as count by Otto, one of her children by Hugh.

References

Sources

1220 births
1266 deaths
Counts of Burgundy
Chalon-Arlay